The Grotto is a sinkhole geological formation and tourist attraction, found on the Great Ocean Road outside Port Campbell in Victoria, Australia. Wooden steps wind down the cliff face to the bottom, providing visibility of the sea beyond a pool at low tide.

See also
Gibson Steps, Victoria
 List of sinkholes of Australia
Loch Ard Gorge
London Arch (formerly London Bridge)
The Twelve Apostles, Victoria

External links

Official Website for 12 Apostles Region of Victoria

Tourist attractions in Victoria (Australia)
Landforms of Victoria (Australia)
Sinkholes of Australia
Great Ocean Road